Theodor von Frimmel, fully Theodor von Frimmel-Traisenau (15 December  1853 in Amstetten, Austria– 3 December 1928 in Vienna) was an Austrian art historian, musicologist and Beethoven biographer. He was born in Amstetten and eventually settled in Vienna.

Biography
Theodor von Frimmel was assistant curator at the Imperial Natural History Museum (Hofmuseum) of Vienna until 1893, later taught art history at the Vienna Athenäum and was director of a gallery. He is mainly remember as musicologist for essays on Beethoven's work, life and images.

Works
 Beethoven und Goethe: eine Studie, 1883
 Neue Beethoveniana, 1888
 Ludwig van Beethoven, 1901
 Beethoven-Studien, München, Georg Müller 1905–1906, (2 vols.)
 Bemerkungen zur angeblich "kritischen" Ausgabe der Briefe Beethovens, Wien, 1907
 Beethoven-Jahrbuch, only 1908/1909
 Beethoven-Briefe, 1910–1911, (5 vols.)
 Beethoven im zeitgenössischen Bildnis. Wien, König 1923
 Neuausgabe des Beethovens-Werkverzeichnisses von G. Nottebohm/Th. v. Frimmel (new list of Beethoven's work), Leipzig, Breitkopf & Härtel 1925
 Beethoven-Handbuch, 2 vols., 1926

References
 Dictionary of art historians
 Correspondence with Heinrich Schenker
 Musical Times, articles on Frimmel contribution on Beethoven's letter
 A short biography (Italian encyclopedia)
 A walk-through explanation of Beethoven correspondence edited by Frimmel 

1853 births
1928 deaths
19th-century Austrian male writers
20th-century Austrian male writers
Austrian biographers
Male biographers
Austrian art historians
German art historians
Beethoven scholars
Austrian expatriates in Germany
Austrian untitled nobility
People from Amstetten, Lower Austria
Writers from Vienna
19th-century musicologists